Patchi is a chocolatier based in Lebanon. Established by Nizar Choucair in 1974, it is distributed across much of the Middle East, and they also sell chocolate internationally.

History
Patchi is traced back to 1974 when Nizar Choucair opened one store on Hamra Street in Beirut, Lebanon. The company expanded to various national markets until 1999 when Patchi started selling in London and Paris. In July 2008, Patchi collaborated with Harrods to produce the most expensive line of chocolates. Patchi also creates chocolates customized to local tastes, events, and festivals.
 As of 2011, Patchi was regarded as one of the most innovative businesses in the Middle East.

Patchi Chocolate Menu
Patchi is a luxury brand for chocolate and chocolate gifts. All chocolates are handmade with all-natural and premium ingredients. The Patchi Chocolate Menu contains a list of over 50 varieties.

The menu is famous for integrating roasted nuts (hazelnuts, pistachios, almonds), Gianduja, orange peel, dried strawberry bits, and more. Recently, Patchi introduced five new exotic flavors to its menu with Cotton Candy, Cheesecake, and Peanut Butter in some of the recipes.

Availability

Patchi operates in 32 countries, with the Middle East being its largest market.

It operates in Armenia, Azerbaijan, Kazakhstan, Bahrain, Brunei, Canada (Online), Egypt, France, Indonesia, Ivory Coast, Jordan, Kingdom of Saudi Arabia, India, Kuwait, Lebanon, Malaysia, Morocco, Oman, Philippines, Qatar, Syria, Tunisia, United Arab Emirates, Ukraine, the United Kingdom, and the United States.

Its boutiques network consists of 145 boutiques. Patchi's online boutique caters to the North American market.

Industrial network and divisions
Patchi has five factories, located in Lebanon, Saudi Arabia, the United Arab Emirates and Egypt.

Aside from chocolate, Patchi runs four other manufacturing divisions, one which produces all packages (printing section), another that manufacters the Silver Line (Patchi Silver), one that creates various fillings for the chocolates, and the Flower division, which develops chocolate decorations and other ornamentation.

References 

Food and drink companies of Lebanon
Food and drink companies established in 1974
1974 establishments in Lebanon
Lebanese brands
Chocolate companies
Brand name chocolate
Luxury brands